Brazil competed at the 2020 Summer Olympics in Tokyo. Originally scheduled to take place from 24 July to 9 August 2020, the Games were postponed to 23 July to 8 August 2021, because of the COVID-19 pandemic. It was the nation's twenty-third appearance at the Summer Olympics, having competed in all editions of the modern era from 1920 onwards, except the 1928 Summer Olympics in Amsterdam.

Tied with 2016 Games in number of gold medals (7) and silver medals (6) but with 2 more bronze medals (8), this was the nation's most successful overall performance at the Olympics, therefore becoming the second nation to surpass its medal total at the Olympics immediately following one that it hosted (the other one was Great Britain in the 2016 Olympics). The country broke the record for medals in one edition (21) and was also in the highest position on medal table on games history (twelfth place). It was also the edition of the Games where Brazil won medals in more different disciplines.

In this edition, Brazil won its first medals ever in three sports: tennis (with the bronze medal obtained by the double Laura Pigossi and Luisa Stefani) and the debutants skateboarding (the 3 silver medals won by Kelvin Hoefler, Rayssa Leal and Pedro Barros) and surfing (the gold medal achieved by Ítalo Ferreira). Brazil also won its first gold medal ever in canoeing, won by Isaquias Queiroz.

Summary
The first Brazilian medal in Tokyo was awarded to skateboarder Kelvin Hoefler in men's street with a score of 36.15 in the first Olympic competition in the sport's history. Japanese skateboarder star Yuto Horigome claimed the first Olympic gold medal with a score of 37.18 and American Jagger Eaton scored a 35.35, winning the bronze medal.

The second medal in Skateboarding, was conquered by the 13-year-old Rayssa Leal in the Olympics's inaugural women's skateboarding competition: the Women's street, one day after the men's street. The board flips, slides and grinds of Brazil's youngest-ever medalist drew as much acclaim as she won the silver medal with a score of 14.64, below the gold medalist Japanese Momiji Nishiya with 15,26. Leal was the youngest athlete to win an Olympic medal since the 1936 Olympic Games and to date among the 10 youngest Olympic medalists ever.

The third medal in Skateboarding was achieved in the inaugural Olympic men's park by Pedro Barros. With a score of 86,14, he won the silver medal, below Australian Keegan Palmer , with a score of 95.83.

In the judo competition, two bronze medals were achieved. In the men's 66 kg competition, Daniel Cargnin lost the semifinal to Japanese gold medalist Hifumi Abe and defeated Israeli Baruch Shmailov in the bronze medal dispute. Twice world champion Mayra Aguiar won one of the bronze medals in the women's 78 kg category, after defeating in bronze medal dispute South Korean Yoon Hyun-ji; she made History conquering three consecutive bronze medals in London 2012, Rio 2016 and Tokyo 2020. She is the first Brazilian woman to win three Olympic medals in an individual sport.

The first gold medal won by Brazil in Tokyo was in Surfing, in the debut of the sport at the Olympic Games.Ítalo Ferreira  earned the first-ever gold after running away from Japanese Kanoa Igarashi in an electric final. The 2019 ISA World Surfing Games Champion recovered from snapping his board early-on and posted wave high scores of 7.77 and a 7.37 for a combined 15.14, while Kanoa Igarashi counted a 3.83 and a 2.77, combining for a 6.60.

In the swimming competitions, three medals were earned, two bronze and one gold medal. Fernando Scheffer won the bronze medal in men's 200 m freestyle, with a time of 1m44s66, behind Britishers silver medalist Duncan Scott (1m44s26) and gold medalist Tom Dean (1m44s22). Bruno Fratus won the bronze medal in men's 50 m freestyle, with a time of 21s57, behind silver medalist Florent Manaudou and gold medalist Caeleb Dressel. Though Fratus had a decorated career at the World Championships, Pan Pacific, and Pan American Games, he finally won an Olympic medal. Fratus became with 32-years-old also the oldest pool swimmer in history to win their first Olympic medal.

The marathon-swimmer Ana Marcela Cunha was the gold medalist in women's marathon of 10 km, won with a time of 1:59:30.8, becoming the first Brazilian woman swimmer to win a gold medal in the Olympics. Former Olympic gold medalist Sharon van Rouwendaal of the Netherlands finished second, with Kareena Lee of Australia taking the bronze. Cunha has obtained, until 2019, 11 medals in World Swimming Championships, 5 being gold, but this was the first Olympic medal in her career.

In Artistic Gymnastic, Rebeca Andrade won two medals. In the qualification round, Andrade had one of the best performances of her career, qualifying in third to the vault final, fourth to floor exercise final, and second to the all-around final. After leading the competition in the first two rotations of the women's all-around final, Andrade won silver medal with a final score of 57.298 after stepping out of bounds on two of her floor passes. American Sunisa Lee won gold with a score of 57.433. This marked the first-ever Olympic medal win for a female Brazilian artistic gymnast and the first Olympic all-around medalist who qualified as an individual.

In the final of Women's vault, Rebeca Andrade set another record for her country, surpassing her third-place vault final qualification to win the event with an average score of 15.083. This made her the first Olympic champion in Brazilian women's artistic gymnastics history and also the first Brazil woman to win more than one medal in a single edition of the Olympic Games. Andrade also served as a flag bearer for Brazil at the Games' closing ceremony.

In the women's doubles tennis tournament, Laura Pigossi and Luisa Stefani earned the bronze medal. They defeated Russians Veronika Kudermetova and defending gold medallist Elena Vesnina in the bronze medal match by 2 sets to 1, saving four straight match points before overcoming in the final set. The medal was one of the most unexpected: the Brazilians got an Olympic spot just one week before the 2020 Games opening, with Luísa Stefani ranked No. 23 in the doubles ranking and Pigossi only at No. 190. Although the Brazilian pair played together for the first time, during the campaign they managed to save eight match-points. In addition to the four in the bronze medal match, they saved another four in the match against Czech duo Karolina Pliskova and Marketa Vondrousova in the round of 16. Pigossi and Stefani became the first Brazilians to obtain an Olympic medal in tennis in history.

Two bronze medals were conquered in athletics. After an Olympic cycle much lower than expected, without medals in World Championships and even in Pan American Games between 2016 and 2020, Olympic record holder and gold medalist in Rio/2016, Thiago Braz participates in men's pole vault in Tokyo/2020 again without being the favorite; in the final he jumped 5.87 m and secured bronze medal, behind the world record holder Swede Armand Duplantis who got gold medal with 6.02 m and the American Chris Nilsen, with 5.97 m got the silver medal. Braz finished with his second consecutive Olympic medal, a very rare feat in Brazilian athletics.

Alison dos Santos got the bronze medal inmen's 400 metres hurdles, in what has been described as one of the greatest races in Olympic history; Karsten Warholm of Norway won, setting a new world record of 45.94 seconds. He beat his own previous record, set a month before, by 0.76 seconds; silver medalist Rai Benjamin of the United States beat the previous record by 0.53 seconds. The event was the strongest in 400m hurdles history, with the three Olympic medalists getting the three best times in the history of the event, all beating Kevin Young's old world record (which had lasted almost 30 years and had only fallen a month before the Olympics). Alison became the 3rd best in the history of the race, with a time of 46.72 seconds.

Martine Grael and Kahena Kunze sailed to gold after winning the women's 49erFX competition. They came in third in the medal race scoring 6 points which bring them a total of 76 points to win the top podium. Germany's Tina Lutz and Susann Beucke clinched silver with a total score of 83 and double world champions Annemiek Bekkering and Annette Duetz from the Netherlands  picked up bronze after amassing 88 points. This was the Brazilian duo's second gold medal in the same event after winning in Rio/2016. Martine Grael continued the tradition of her family in sailing: her father Torben Grael is five-time Olympic medalist (twice gold) and her uncle Lars Grael is a twice bronze medalist.

In the Canoeing, The reigning World Champion Isaquias Queiroz and silver medallist in Rio/2016, finished with a time of four minutes, 04.408 seconds, ahead of China's Liu Hao and Moldova's Serghei Tarnovschi for his maiden Olympic title. He become the first Brazilian to win an Olympic gold medal in Canoeing and it was also the fourth Olympic medal in his career. Isaquias had been through adversity in his younger years. As a toddler he poured boiling water on himself and spent a month in hospital recovering, at the age of 5 he was kidnapped and offered up for adoption before being rescued by his mother, and 5 years later he fell out of a tree while trying to catch a snake and lost a kidney.

In the boxing competitions, Brazilians earned three Olympic medals. Abner Teixeira lost the semifinal to Cuban 	Julio César La Cruz in men's heavyweight and was awarded a bronze medal. Reigning world champion Beatriz Ferreira was the silver medalist in women's lightweight in Boxing. She lost the final to Kellie Harrington from Ireland in a unanimous decision. This is the best result achieved by a Brazilian woman in Boxing at Olympic Games.

Hebert Conceição won the gold medal in the men's middleweight event at the 2020 Summer Olympics in one of the most shocking fights in Tokyo, by knocking out Ukrainian Oleksandr Khyzhniak in the third round . Khyzhniak had spent the fight's first  minutes smacking Conceição around the ring with his vicious combination of power and accuracy and won the first two rounds unanimously. In the third and final round, the Brazilian caught Khyzhniak with a counter left hook during an exchange, and Khyzhniak went to the canvas hard. The referee declared Hebert Conceição winner by knock out . He joins lightweight Robson Conceição as the only boxing gold medalists in Brazil's Olympic history.

The seventh gold medal earned by Brazil in Tokyo was awarded in men's football tournament. The incumbent gold medalists in Rio/2016 finished at the top of their group with 7 points, following a 4–2 win over Germany, a 0–0 draw to Ivory Coast and a 3–1 win over Saudi Arabia. They beat Egypt 1–0 in the quarter-finals, and Mexico in the semi-finals with a 4–1 victory in the penalty shootouts following a 0–0 draw in extra time. In the final against Spain, Matheus Cunha opened the score for Brazil in the first half and a Mikel Oyarzabal goal in the second half forced the match into extra time; Malcom scored the winning goal in the 108th minute, which lead Brazil to their second Olympic gold medal and seventh medal in men's football at Olympic Games. Brazil became the fifth country to win back-to-back Olympic golds, after Great Britain (1908, 1912), Uruguay(1924, 1928), Hungary (1964, 1968) and Argentina (2004, 2008). Among the players, Daniel Alves was Brazil's 38-year-old captain, who had led the team as an over-age player and became the most decorated football player with his personal trophy haul to 43 titles.

In the Volleyball competitions, the last Brazilian medal of 2020 Summer Olympics was a silver one achieved by Brazil women's national volleyball team. The team went undefeated in the pool round and in the bracket leading up to the final after winning 7 matches, but lost easily by 3 sets to 0 (25–21, 25–20, 25–14) to United States women's national volleyball team, who won its first gold medal in women's volleyball. Nonetheless, the silver medal in women's volleyball, Brazil had the poorest campaign in the sport since the 1992 Summer Olympics, with a fourth place in men's tournament and missing a medal in beach volleyball for the first time since the inaugural tournament in 1996 Summer Olympics.

Medalists

| width="78%" align="left" valign="top" |

| width="22%" align="left" valign="top" |

Multiple medallist

The following competitor won multiple medals at the 2020 Olympic Games.

Competitors
The following is the list of number of competitors in the Games. Note that reserves in athletics, equestrian, football, handball, rugby sevens, and table tennis are not counted:

Archery

One Brazilian archer secured a quota place in the men's individual recurve by winning the silver medal and receiving a spare berth unused in the mixed team at the 2019 Pan American Games in Lima, Peru. Another Brazilian archer scored a gold-medal triumph to book one of three available spots in the women's individual recurve at the 2021 Pan American Qualification Tournament in Monterrey, Mexico.

Athletics

Brazilian athletes further achieved the entry standards, either by qualifying time or by world ranking, in the following track and field events (up to a maximum of 3 athletes in each event): The team was selected by the Brazilian Athletics Confederation on 1 July 2021.

Track & road events
Men

Women

Mixed

Field events
Men

Women

Combined events – Men's decathlon

Badminton

Brazil entered two badminton players (one per gender) into the Olympic tournament. Rio 2016 Olympian Ygor Coelho de Oliveira and debutant Fabiana Silva were selected to compete in the men's and women's singles based on the BWF World Race to Tokyo Rankings.

Boxing

Brazil entered seven boxers (four male and three female) to compete in each of the following weight classes into the Olympic tournament. With the cancellation of the 2021 Pan American Qualification Tournament in Buenos Aires, Wanderson de Oliveira (men's flyweight), Hebert Conceição (men's middleweight), Keno Machado (men's light heavyweight), Abner Teixeira (men's heavyweight), Graziele de Sousa (women's flyweight), Jucielen Romeu (women's featherweight), and reigning Pan American Games gold medalist Beatriz Ferreira (women's lightweight) finished among the top five of their respective weight divisions to secure their places in the Brazilian squad based on the IOC's Boxing Task Force Rankings for the Americas.

Men

Women

Canoeing

Slalom
Brazilian canoeists qualified one boat for each of the following classes through the 2019 ICF Canoe Slalom World Championships in La Seu d'Urgell, Spain.

Sprint
Brazilian canoeists qualified two boats in each of the following distances for the Games through the 2019 ICF Canoe Sprint World Championships in Szeged, Hungary. With the cancellation of the 2021 Pan American Championships, Brazil accepted the invitation from the International Canoe Federation to send a canoeist in the men's K-1 1000 m to the Games.

Qualification Legend: FA = Qualify to final (medal); FB = Qualify to final B (non-medal)

Cycling

Mountain biking
Brazilian mountain bikers qualified for two men's and one women's quota place each into the Olympic cross-country race, as a result of the nation's fifth-place finish for men and eighteenth for women, respectively, in the UCI Olympic Ranking List of 16 May 2021. The mountain biking team was named on May 31, 2021, with Jaqueline Mourão leading the riders to her third Summer Olympics.

BMX
Brazil received one men's and one women's quota spot each for BMX at the Olympics, as a result of the nation's ninth-place finish for men and seventh for women in the UCI Olympic Ranking List of June 1, 2021. Two-time Olympian Renato Rezende and her Rio 2016 teammate Priscilla Carnaval were officially named on June 10, 2021.

Diving

Brazil sent four divers (two per gender) into the Olympic competition by reaching the semifinals of the men's and women's 10 m platform and women's 3 m springboard at the 2020 FINA Diving World Cup.

Equestrian

Brazilian equestrians qualified a full squad each in team eventing and jumping competitions by virtue of a top-three finish at the 2019 Pan American Games in Lima, Peru.

Unable to fulfill the NOC Certificate of Capability at the end of the 2019 season, Brazil received a spot for an equestrian competing in the individual dressage by finishing in the top four, outside the group selection, of the individual FEI Olympic Rankings for Group E (Central and South America).

Dressage

Qualification Legend: Q = Qualified for the final; q = Qualified for the final as a lucky loser

Eventing

(s) – substituted before jumping – 20 replacement penalties

Jumping

Pedro Veniss and Quabri de l'Isle have been named the traveling alternates.

Fencing

Brazil entered two fencers into the Olympic competition. Rio 2016 Olympians Guilherme Toldo (men's foil) and 2019 world champion Nathalie Moellhausen (women's épée) claimed spots in their respective individual events as the highest-ranked fencers vying for qualification from the Americas in the FIE Adjusted Official Rankings.

Football

Summary

Men's tournament

Brazil men's football team qualified for the Olympics by securing an outright berth as the runners-up in the final stage of the 2020 CONMEBOL Pre-Olympic Tournament in Colombia.

Team roster

Group play

Quarter-finals

Semi-finals

Gold medal match

Women's tournament

Brazil women's football team qualified for the Olympics by winning the gold medal and securing a lone outright berth at the 2018 Copa América Femenina in Chile.

Team roster

Group play

Quarter-finals

Gymnastics

Artistic
At the 2019 World Artistic Gymnastics Championships in Stuttgart, Germany, the men's squad booked one of the remaining nine berths in the team all-around, while Rio 2016 Olympian Flávia Saraiva topped the list of those eligible for qualification to secure a spot in the women's individual all-around and apparatus events. Brazil failed to qualify a women's squad for the first time since 2000. Additionally, Rebeca Andrade and Diogo Soares earned one of the two continental berths available per gender in the all-around competition at the 2021 Pan American Championships in Rio de Janeiro. In total, Brazil selected seven gymnasts (five men and two women) to compete at the Games.

Men
Team

Individual

Women

Rhythmic 
Brazil fielded a squad of rhythmic gymnasts to compete at the Olympics, by winning the gold medal in the team all-around competition at the 2021 Pan American Championships in Rio de Janeiro.

Handball

Summary

Men's tournament

Brazil men's national handball team qualified for the Olympics by securing a top-two finish at the Podgorica leg of the 2020 IHF Olympic Qualification Tournament.

Team roster

Group play

Women's tournament

Brazil women's handball team qualified for the Olympics by winning the gold medal and securing an outright berth at the final match of the 2019 Pan American Games in Lima.

Team roster

Group play

Judo
 
Brazil qualified a squad of 13 judoka (seven men and six women) for each of the following weight classes at the Games by virtue of their top 18 finish in the IJF World Ranking List of 28 June 2021. The judo team was named to the Olympic roster on 16 June 2021, including Olympic bronze medalists Rafael Silva and Mayra Aguiar (London 2012 and Rio 2016) and Ketleyn Quadros (Beijing 2008).

Men

Women

Mixed

Modern pentathlon
 
Brazilian athletes qualified for the following spots to compete in modern pentathlon. Maria Iêda Guimarães secured a selection in women's event by finishing in the top two for Latin America and fourth overall at the 2019 Pan American Games in Lima.

Rowing

Brazil qualified one boat in the men's single sculls for the Games by winning the gold medal and securing the first of five berths available at the 2021 FISA Americas Olympic Qualification Regatta in Rio de Janeiro.

Qualification Legend: FA=Final A (medal); FB=Final B (non-medal); FC=Final C (non-medal); FD=Final D (non-medal); FE=Final E (non-medal); FF=Final F (non-medal); SA/B=Semifinals A/B; SC/D=Semifinals C/D; SE/F=Semifinals E/F; QF=Quarterfinals; R=Repechage

Rugby sevens

Summary

Women's tournament

The Brazil women's national rugby sevens team qualified for the Olympics by winning the gold medal and securing a lone outright berth at the 2019 Sudamérica Rugby Women's Sevens Olympic Qualifying Tournament in Lima, Peru.

Team roster

Group B

9–12th place playoff

11th place match

Sailing

Brazilian sailors qualified one boat in each of the following classes through the 2018 Sailing World Championships, the class-associated Worlds, the 2019 Pan American Games, and the continental regattas.

After meeting the selection criteria at the 2020 Laser Worlds, multiple medalist Robert Scheidt was officially named to the country's sailing fleet. Moreover, he established a historic record as the first ever Brazilian to participate in seven straight Olympics. Skiff siblings and Rio 2016 Olympians Marco and Martine Grael, along with their respective partners Gabriel Borges (49er) and Kahena Kunze (49erFX), were added to the roster on 16 February 2020. Finn sailor and two-time Olympian Jorge Zarif and the Nacra 17 crew (Samuel Albrecht and his new partner Gabriela Nicolino de Sá) secured their places at the 2020 Copa Brasil, while Rio 2016 Olympians Bruno Bethlem and Henrique Haddad topped the sailing fleet at the national selection trials for the men's 470 to join the Tokyo 2020 roster.

Men

Women

Mixed

M = Medal race; EL = Eliminated – did not advance into the medal race

Shooting

Brazil granted an invitation from ISSF to send Rio 2016 silver medalist Felipe Almeida Wu (men's 10 m air pistol) to the rescheduled Games as the highest-ranked shooter vying for qualification in the ISSF World Olympic Rankings of 6 June 2021.

Skateboarding

Brazil entered twelve skateboarders (six per gender) to compete in each of the following events at the Games based on the World Skate Olympic Rankings List of 30 June 2021.

Men

Women

Surfing

Brazil sent four surfers (two per gender) to compete in the shortboard at the Games. Two-time world champion Gabriel Medina, one-time world champion Ítalo Ferreira, Silvana Lima, and Tatiana Weston-Webb finished within the top ten (for men) and top eight (for women), respectively, of those eligible for qualification in the World Surf League rankings to secure their spots on the Brazilian roster for Tokyo 2020.

Swimming 

Brazilian swimmers further achieved qualifying standards in the following events (up to a maximum of 2 swimmers in each event at the Olympic Qualifying Time (OQT), and potentially 1 at the Olympic Selection Time (OST)). To secure their nomination to the Olympic team, swimmers must finish in the top two of each individual pool event under the FINA Olympic qualifying A standard at the Brazilian Olympic Trials (19 to 24 April) in Rio de Janeiro.

Men

Women

Mixed

Table tennis

Brazil entered six athletes into the table tennis competition at the Games. The men's and women's teams secured their respective Olympic berths by winning the gold medal each at the Latin America Qualification Event in Lima, Peru, permitting a maximum of two starters to compete each in the men's and women's singles tournament.

Men

Women

Taekwondo

Brazil entered three athletes into the taekwondo competition at the Games. 2019 Pan American Games champions Edival Pontes (men's 68 kg) and Milena Titoneli (women's 67 kg), along with silver medalist Ícaro Miguel Soares (men's 80 kg) secured the spots on the Brazilian squad with a top two finish each in their respective weight classes at the 2020 Pan American Qualification Tournament in San José, Costa Rica.

Tennis

Brazil entered six tennis players (four men and two women) into the Olympic tournament. João Menezes secured an outright berth in the men's singles by advancing to the final match at the 2019 Pan American Games in Lima, with Thiago Monteiro (world no. 83) joining him based on the ATP World Rankings of June 13, 2021.

Having been directly entered into the singles, Monteiro opted to play with his partner Marcelo Demoliner in the men's doubles, following the eventual withdrawals of several tennis players, with Marcelo Melo and Bruno Soares teaming up for the third consecutive time at the Games by finishing among the world's top 20 in the ATP Doubles Rankings. On the women's side, Luisa Stefani and Laura Pigossi granted an invitation from ITF to compete in the doubles, as several tennis players opted to withdraw from the tournament.

Soares felt a severe abdominal pain during the flight to Tokyo. He was diagnosed with appendicitis and had to undergo surgery, which he prevented from participating in the competition. Instead, his partner Melo officially paired up with Demoliner.

Triathlon

Brazil entered three triathletes (one man and two women) to compete at the Olympics. Manoel Messias, Luisa Baptista, and Vittória Lopes were selected among the top 26 triathletes vying for qualification in their respective events based on the individual ITU World Rankings of 15 June 2021.

Volleyball

Beach
Four Brazilian beach volleyball teams (two per gender) qualified directly for the Olympics by virtue of their nation's top 15 placement in the FIVB Olympic Rankings of 13 June 2021.

Indoor
Summary

Men's tournament

Brazil men's volleyball team qualified for the Olympics by securing an outright berth as the highest-ranked nation for pool A at the Intercontinental Olympic Qualification Tournament in Varna, Bulgaria.

Team roster

Group play

Quarterfinal

Semifinal

Bronze medal game

Women's tournament

Brazil women's volleyball team qualified for the Olympics by securing an outright berth as the highest-ranked nation for pool D at the Intercontinental Olympic Qualification Tournament in Uberlândia.

Team roster

Group play

Quarterfinal

Semifinal

Gold medal game

Weightlifting

Brazil entered two female weightlifters into the Olympic competition. Nathasha Rosa finished seventh of the eight highest-ranked weightlifters in the women's 49 kg category based on the IWF Absolute World Rankings, with two-time Olympian Jaqueline Ferreira topping the field of weightlifters vying for qualification from the Americas in the women's 87 kg category based on the IWF Absolute Continental Rankings. Initially set to compete in the men's +109 kg category at his third Games, Fernando Reis was tested positive for a human growth hormone, which reportedly excluded him from the team.

Wrestling

Brazil qualified three wrestlers for each of the following classes into the Olympic competition; all of whom advanced to the top two finals to book Olympic spots in the men's Greco-Roman 130 kg and women's freestyle (62 and 76 kg), respectively, at the 2020 Pan American Qualification Tournament in Ottawa, Canada.

Freestyle

Greco-Roman

See also
Brazil at the 2019 Pan American Games
Brazil at the 2020 Summer Paralympics

References

Nations at the 2020 Summer Olympics
2020
2021 in Brazilian sport